Events in the year 1692 in Norway.

Incumbents
Monarch: Christian V

Events
 The last of the Finmark witch trials takes place, Anders Poulsen, an old Sámi shaman is put on trial.
The first Chief of police is hired in Bergen.
The  ironwork is established.

Arts and literature

Old Gimmestad Church is built.

Births

29 December – Thomas Angell, merchant, philanthropist (died 1767).

Deaths
11 February – Anders Paulsen, Sami noaidi (born c. 1600).

Cuisine
 13 June - The first known recipe for Bløtkake is written down.

See also

References